FC Schalke 04 had another disappointing season, in spite of the success of new stadium and UEFA Champions League final host Arena AufSchalke. Within weeks in the autumn, Schalke's chances of winning a trophy was slashed, losing to Brøndby in the UEFA Cup and a humiliating collapse to Freiburg in the extra time of the domestic cup, losing 7–3. The seventh position in the league also ensured Schalke had to go through the Intertoto Cup to reach European competitions, putting further pressure on coach Jupp Heynckes.

Squad

Goalkeepers
  Frank Rost
  Christofer Heimeroth
  Volkan Ünlü

Defenders
  Marco van Hoogdalem
  Aníbal Matellán
  Darío Rodríguez
  Tomasz Hajto
  Levan Kobiashvili
  Nico van Kerckhoven
  Fabian Lamotte
  Tomasz Wałdoch
  Christian Pander
  Thomas Kläsener

Midfielders
  Sven Kmetsch
  Hamit Altıntop
  Jörg Böhme
  Kristijan Đorđević
  Christian Poulsen
  Sérgio Pinto
  Filip Trojan
  Niels Oude Kamphuis
  Gustavo Varela
  Andreas Möller
  Simon Cziommer
  Michael Delura

Attackers
  Eduard Glieder
  Victor Agali
  Mike Hanke
  Gerald Asamoah
  Abdul Iyodo
  Ebbe Sand

Competitions

Bundesliga

League table

Matches

 Schalke 04-Borussia Dortmund 2–2
 1–0 Hamit Altıntop 
 2–0 Hamit Altıntop 
 2–1 Flávio Conceição 
 2–2 Márcio Amoroso 
 1860 Munich-Schalke 04 1–1
 1–0 Markus Schroth 
 1–1 Darío Rodríguez 
 Schalke 04–Köln 2–1
 1–0 Victor Agali 
 1–1 Dirk Lottner 
 2–1 Hamit Altıntop 
 Werder Bremen-Schalke 04 4–1
 1–0 Angelos Charisteas 
 2–0 Tim Borowski 
 3–0 Aílton 
 4–0 Nelson Valdez 
 4–1 Victor Agali 
 Schalke 04-Stuttgart 0–0
 Freiburg-Schalke 04 2–1
 1–0 Zlatan Bajramović 
 1–1 Darío Rodríguez 
 2–1 Levan Tskitishvili 
 Schalke 04-Eintracht Frankfurt 1–1
 1–0 Darío Rodríguez 
 1–1 Chris 
 Hannover-Schalke 04 1–2
 1–0 Thomas Christiansen 
 1–1 Gerald Asamoah 
 1–2 Darío Rodríguez 
 Schalke 04-Bochum 0–2
 0–1 Frank Fahrenhorst 
 0–2 Mamadou Diabang 
 Hamburg-Schalke 04 2–2
 1–0 Bernardo Romeo 
 2–0 Bernardo Romeo 
 2–1 Aníbal Matellán 
 2–2 Eduard Glieder 
 Schalke 04-Bayern Munich 2–0
 1–0 Tomasz Hajto 
 2–0 Niels Oude Kamphuis 
 Bayer Leverkusen-Schalke 04 3–1
 1–0 Dimitar Berbatov 
 1–1 Mike Hanke 
 2–1 Marko Babić 
 3–1 Daniel Bierofka 
 Schalke 04-Hansa Rostock 0–1
 0–1 Razundara Tjikuzu 
 Hertha Berlin-Schalke 04 1–3
 1–0 Denis Lapaczinski 
 1–1 Niels Oude Kamphuis 
 1–2 Tomasz Wałdoch 
 1–3 Gerald Asamoah 
 Schalke 04-Mönchengladbach 2–1
 1–0 Jochen Seitz 
 1–1 Ivo Ulich 
 2–1 Jochen Seitz 
 Kaiserslautern-Schalke 04 0–2
 0–1 Gerald Asamoah 
 0–2 Victor Agali 
 Schalke 04-Wolfsburg 1–1
 1–0 Hamit Altıntop 
 1–1 Martin Petrov 
 Borussia Dortmund-Schalke 04 0–1
 0–1 Ebbe Sand 
 Schalke 04–1860 Munich 0–0
 Köln-Schalke 04 0–2
 0–1 Nico van Kerckhoven 
 0–2 Michael Delura 
 Schalke 04-Werder Bremen 0–0
 Stuttgart-Schalke 04 0–0
 Schalke 04-Freiburg 3–0
 1–0 Ebbe Sand 
 2–0 Ebbe Sand 
 3–0 Eduard Glieder 
 Eintracht Frankfurt-Schalke 04 3–0
 1–0 Ioannis Amanatidis 
 2–0 Ervin Skela 
 3–0 Alexander Schur 
 Schalke 04-Hannover 2–2
 0–1 Thomas Brdarić 
 1–1 Per Mertesacker 
 1–2 Thomas Brdarić 
 2–2 Ebbe Sand 
 Bochum-Schalke 04 1–2
 1–0 Martin Meichelbeck 
 1–1 Thomas Kläsener 
 1–2 Michael Delura 
 Schalke 04-Hamburg 4–1
 1–0 Tomasz Wałdoch 
 2–0 Ebbe Sand 
 2–1 Mehdi Mahdavikia 
 3–1 Fabian Lamotte 
 4–1 Michael Delura 
 Bayern Munich-Schalke 04 2–1
 0–1 Sven Vermant 
 1–1 Roy Makaay 
 2–1 Roy Makaay 
 Schalke 04-Bayer Leverkusen 2–3
 0–1 Dimitar Berbatov 
 1–1 Michael Delura 
 1–2 Bernd Schneider 
 1–3 Hans-Jörg Butt 
 2–3 Mike Hanke 
 Hansa Rostock-Schalke 04 3–1
 0–1 Gerald Asamoah 
 1–1 Razundara Tjikuzu 
 2–1 Martin Max 
 3–1 Martin Max 
 Schalke 04-Hertha Berlin 3–0
 1–0 Hamit Altıntop 
 2–0 Jörg Böhme 
 3–0 Ebbe Sand 
 Mönchengladbach-Schalke 04 2–0
 1–0 Markus Hausweiler 
 2–0 Václav Svěrkoš 
 Schalke 04–Kaiserslautern 4–1
 0-1 Torsten Reuter 
 1–1 Ebbe Sand 
 2–1 Sven Vermant 
 3–1 Hamit Altıntop 
 4–1 Ebbe Sand 
 Wolfsburg-Schalke 04 1–1
 1–0 Miroslav Karhan 
 1–1 Maik Franz

Topscorers
  Ebbe Sand 7
  Hamit Altıntop 6
  Darío Rodríguez 4
  Gerald Asamoah 4
  Michael Delura 3
  Victor Agali 3

References

FC Schalke 04 seasons
Schalke 04